The 16th Satellite Awards is an award ceremony honoring the year's outstanding performers, films, television shows, home videos and interactive media, presented by the International Press Academy at the Hyatt Regency Century Plaza in Century City, Los Angeles.

The nominations were announced on December 1, 2011. The winners were announced on December 18, 2011.

The categories for motion picture were pared down from 22 to 19 classifications; the change reflected the merger of comedy and drama under a general Best Picture heading.

Special achievement awards
Auteur Award (for his body of film work, as well as his books on the inner workings of filmmaking and filmmakers) – Peter Bogdanovich

Humanitarian Award (for community involvement and work on social causes) – Tim Hetherington

Mary Pickford Award (for outstanding contribution to the entertainment industry) – Mitzi Gaynor

Nikola Tesla Award (for his work as film preservationist and historian) – Douglas Trumbull

Best First Feature – Paddy Considine (Tyrannosaur)

Best Educational Motion Picture – The First Grader (Sam Feuer, Richard Harding, David Thompson - Producers)

Career of Outstanding Service in the Entertainment Industry – Brian Edwards

Outstanding Performance in a TV Series – Jessica Lange (American Horror Story)

Motion picture winners and nominees

Winners are listed first and highlighted in bold.

{| class=wikitable style="width="100%"
|-
! style="background:#EEDD82;" | Best Film
! style="background:#EEDD82;" | Best Director
|-
| valign="top" |
The Descendants
The Artist
Drive
The Help
Hugo
Midnight in Paris
Moneyball
Shame
Tinker, Tailor, Soldier, Spy
War Horse
| valign="top" |
Nicolas Winding Refn – Drive
Tomas Alfredson – Tinker, Tailor, Soldier, Spy
Woody Allen – Midnight in Paris
Michel Hazanavicius – The Artist
Steve McQueen – Shame
John Michael McDonagh – The Guard
Alexander Payne – The Descendants
Martin Scorsese – Hugo
Steven Spielberg – War Horse
Tate Taylor – The Help
|-
! style="background:#EEDD82;" | Best Actor
! style="background:#EEDD82;" | Best Actress
|-
| valign="top" |
Ryan Gosling – Drive as the Driver
George Clooney – The Descendants as Matthew "Matt" King
Leonardo DiCaprio – J. Edgar as J. Edgar Hoover
Michael Fassbender – Shame as Brandon Sullivan
Brendan Gleeson – The Guard as Sergeant Gerry Boyle
Tom Hardy – Warrior as Tommy Riordan
Woody Harrelson – Rampart as Officer David "Dave" Brown
Gary Oldman – Tinker, Tailor, Soldier, Spy as George Smiley
Brad Pitt – Moneyball as Billy Beane
Michael Shannon – Take Shelter as Curtis LaForche
| valign="top" |
Viola Davis – The Help as Aibeleen Clark
Glenn Close – Albert Nobbs as Albert Nobbs
Olivia Colman – Tyrannosaur as Hannah
Vera Farmiga – Higher Ground as Corinne Walker
Elizabeth Olsen – Martha Marcy May Marlene as Martha / Marcy May / Marlene Lewis
Meryl Streep – The Iron Lady as Margaret Thatcher
Charlize Theron – Young Adult as Mavis Gary
Emily Watson – Oranges and Sunshine as Margaret Humphreys
Michelle Williams – My Week with Marilyn as Marilyn Monroe
Michelle Yeoh – The Lady as Aung San Suu Kyi
|-
! style="background:#EEDD82;" | Best Supporting Actor
! style="background:#EEDD82;" | Best Supporting Actress
|-
| valign="top" |
Albert Brooks – Drive as Bernie Rose
Kenneth Branagh – My Week with Marilyn as Laurence Olivier
Colin Farrell – Horrible Bosses as Bobby Pellit
Jonah Hill – Moneyball as Peter Brand
Viggo Mortensen – A Dangerous Method as Sigmund Freud
Nick Nolte – Warrior as Paddy Conlon
Christopher Plummer – Beginners as Hal Fields
Andy Serkis – Rise of the Planet of the Apes as Caesar
Christoph Waltz – Carnage as Alan Cowan
Hugo Weaving – Oranges and Sunshine as Jack
| valign="top" |
Jessica Chastain – The Tree of Life as Mrs. O'Brien
Elle Fanning – Super 8 as Alice Dainard
 Lisa Féret – Mozart's Sister as Princess Louise of France
Judy Greer – The Descendants as Julie Speer
Rachel McAdams – Midnight in Paris as Inez
Janet McTeer – Albert Nobbs as Hubert Page
Carey Mulligan – Shame as Sissy Sullivan
Vanessa Redgrave – Coriolanus as Volumnia
Octavia Spencer – The Help as Minerva "Minny" Jackson
Kate Winslet – Carnage as Nancy Cowan
|-
! style="background:#EEDD82;" | Best Original Screenplay
! style="background:#EEDD82;" | Best Adapted Screenplay
|-
| valign="top" |
The Tree of Life – Terrence MalickThe Artist – Michel Hazanavicius
The Guard – John Michael McDonagh
Mozart's Sister – René Féret
Shame – Abi Morgan and Steve McQueen
Tyrannosaur – Paddy Considine
| valign="top" |The Descendants – Alexander Payne, Nat Faxon, and Jim RashThe Adventures of Tintin – Steven Moffat, Edgar Wright, and Joe Cornish
Albert Nobbs – Glenn Close and John Banville
The Help – Tate Taylor
Moneyball – Steven Zaillian and Aaron Sorkin
War Horse – Lee Hall and Richard Curtis
|-
! style="background:#EEDD82;" | Best Animated or Mixed Media Film
! style="background:#EEDD82;" | Best Foreign Language Film
|-
| valign="top" |The Adventures of Tintin
Kung Fu Panda 2
The Muppets
Puss in Boots
Rango
Rio
| valign="top" |
Mysteries of Lisbon (Portugal)13 Assassins (Japan / United Kingdom)
Faust (Russia)
The Kid with a Bike (Belgium / France / Italy)
Las Acacias (Argentina)
Le Havre (Finland / France / Germany)
Miss Bala (Mexico)
Mozart's Sister (France)
A Separation (Iran)
The Turin Horse (Hungary)
|-
! style="background:#EEDD82;" | Best Documentary Film
! style="background:#EEDD82;" | Best Cinematography
|-
| valign="top" |Senna
American: The Bill Hicks Story
Cave of Forgotten Dreams
The Interrupters
My Perestroika
One Lucky Elephant
Pina
Project Nim
Tabloid
Under Fire: Journalists in Combat
| valign="top" |
War Horse – Janusz KamińskiThe Artist – Guillaume Schiffman
Drive – Newton Thomas Sigel
Faust – Bruno Delbonnel
Hugo – Robert Richardson
The Tree of Life – Emmanuel Lubezki
|-
! style="background:#EEDD82;" | Best Original Score
! style="background:#EEDD82;" | Best Original Song
|-
| valign="top" |Soul Surfer – Marco BeltramiDrive – Cliff Martinez
Harry Potter and the Deathly Hallows – Part 2 – Alexandre Desplat
Super 8 – Michael Giacchino
War Horse – John Williams
Water for Elephants – James Newton Howard
| valign="top" |"Lay Your Head Down" – Albert Nobbs
"Bridge of Light" – Happy Feet Two
"Gathering Stories" – We Bought a Zoo
"Hello Hello" – Gnomeo & Juliet
"Life's a Happy Song" – The Muppets
"Man or Muppet" – The Muppets
|-
! style="background:#EEDD82;" | Best Visual Effects
! style="background:#EEDD82;" | Best Art Direction and Production Design
|-
| valign="top" |
Hugo
Harry Potter and the Deathly Hallows – Part 2
Rise of the Planet of the Apes
Super 8
Transformers: Dark of the Moon
War Horse
| valign="top" |
The ArtistAnonymousFaustHugoMysteries of LisbonWater for Elephants|-
! style="background:#EEDD82;" | Best Film Editing
! style="background:#EEDD82;" | Best Sound (Editing and Mixing)
|-
| valign="top" |The GuardThe Descendants
Drive
Shame
War Horse
Warrior
| valign="top" |DriveHarry Potter and the Deathly Hallows – Part 2
Super 8
Transformers: Dark of the Moon
The Tree of Life
War Horse
|-
! style="background:#EEDD82;" | Best Costume Design
! style="background:#EEDD82;" | Best Ensemble – Motion Picture
|-
| valign="top" |Water for ElephantsAnonymous
The Artist
Faust
Jane Eyre
Mysteries of Lisbon
| valign="top" |The HelpAnna CampJessica ChastainViola DavisNelsan EllisBryce Dallas HowardDana IveyAllison JanneyLeslie JordanBrian KerwinChris LowellAhna O'ReillyDavid OyelowoSissy SpacekOctavia SpencerMary SteenburgenEmma StoneCicely TysonMike Vogel|}

Television winners and nominees

Winners are listed first and highlighted in bold.

New Media winners and nominees
Winners are listed first and highlighted in bold.

Awards breakdown

Film
Winners:4 / 8 Drive: Best Actor / Best Director / Best Sound (Editing and Mixing) / Best Supporting Actor2 / 4 The Tree of Life: Best Original Screenplay / Best Supporting Actress2 / 6 The Descendants: Best Adapted Screenplay / Best Film2 / 6 The Help: Best Actress / Best Ensemble – Motion Picture1 / 1 Senna: Best Documentary Film1 / 1 Soul Surfer: Best Original Score1 / 2 The Adventures of Tintin: Best Animated or Mixed Media Film1 / 3 Mysteries of Lisbon: Best Foreign Language Film1 / 3 Water for Elephants: Best Costume Design1 / 4 Albert Nobbs: Best Original Song1 / 4 The Guard: Best Film Editing1 / 5 Hugo: Best Visual Effects1 / 6 The Artist: Best Art Direction and Production Design1 / 8 War Horse: Best Cinematography1 / 1 The First Grader: Best Educational Motion Picture

Losers:0 / 6 Shame0 / 4 Faust, Moneyball, Super 80 / 3 Harry Potter and the Deathly Hallows – Part 2, Midnight in Paris, Mozart's Sister, The Muppets, Tinker, Tailor, Soldier, Spy, Warrior0 / 2 Anonymous, Carnage, My Week with Marilyn, Oranges and Sunshine, Rise of the Planet of the Apes, Transformers: Dark of the Moon, Tyrannosaur

Television
Winners:2 / 4 Justified: Best Actor in a Drama Series / Best Drama Series2 / 5 Mildred Pierce: Best Actress in a Miniseries or TV Film / Best Miniseries or TV Film1 / 1 American Horror Story: Best Genre Series1 / 1 Case Histories: Best Actor in a Miniseries or TV Film1 / 1 Homeland: Best Actress in a Drama Series1 / 1 Raising Hope: Best Actress in a Musical or Comedy Series1 / 2 Desperate Housewives: Best Supporting Actress in a Series, Miniseries, or TV Film1 / 2 Game of Thrones: Best Supporting Actor in a Series, Miniseries, or TV Film1 / 2 It's Always Sunny in Philadelphia: Best Musical or Comedy Series1 / 2 Louie: Best Actor in a Musical or Comedy Series1 / 3 Sons of Anarchy: Best Supporting Actor in a Series, Miniseries, or TV Film

Losers:0 / 4 Downton Abbey0 / 3 Boardwalk Empire, Community, Friday Night Lights, Modern Family, Page Eight, Too Big to Fail0 / 2' The Big C, Breaking Bad, Cinema Verite, Episodes, The Killing, Thurgood, Torchwood, Treme''

References

External links
 International Press Academy website

Satellite Awards ceremonies
2011 film awards
2011 television awards
December 2011 events in the United States
2011 in California
2011 video game awards